In the Name of Love is a 1925 American silent comedy film directed by Howard Higgin and written by Sada Cowan. It is based on the play The Lady of Lyons by Edward Bulwer-Lytton. It stars Ricardo Cortez, Greta Nissen, Wallace Beery, Raymond Hatton, Lillian Leighton, Edythe Chapman, and Richard Arlen. It was released on August 10, 1925 by Paramount Pictures.

Plot
As described in a film magazine advertisement, young Frenchman Raoul Melnotte, leaving his boyhood sweetheart Marie behind, goes to America to make his fortune. Marie promises to wait for him. Ten years later he returns to France, his fortune still unmade. Marie, however, has grown rich and snobbish. Hosts of men have made love to her, but her heart is set upon meeting a Prince of Como, who is visiting France, and will have nothing to do with Raoul. Glavis and the Marquis de Beausant, who have been lilted by the coquettish Marie, suggest to Raoul that he masquerade as the Prince of Como, marry Marie, and then humiliate her. He carries through the plan, and she weds him. When she finds out that she has been tricked, she is furious. Her brother Dumas, discovering the fraud, attacks Raoul and is about to kill him when Marie, realizing that she loves the masquerader in spite of everything, saves his life.

Cast

Preservation
With no prints of In the Name of Love located in any film archives, it is a lost film.

References

External links

1925 films
1920s English-language films
Silent American comedy films
Lost American films
1925 comedy films
Paramount Pictures films
Films based on works by Edward Bulwer-Lytton
American black-and-white films
Films directed by Howard Higgin
American silent feature films
1925 lost films
Lost comedy films
1920s American films